The year 1944 in film involved some significant events, including the wholesome, award-winning Going My Way plus popular murder mysteries such as Double Indemnity, Gaslight and Laura.

Top-grossing films (U.S.)
The top ten 1944 released films by box office gross in North America are as follows:

Events
March 10 – MGM's A Guy Named Joe, starring Spencer Tracy and Irene Dunne, is released nationally in the United States.
May 3 – The film Going My Way, directed by Leo McCarey and starring Bing Crosby and Barry Fitzgerald, premieres in New York City. The highest-grossing picture of the year, it goes on to win a total of seven Academy Awards, including Best Picture, Best Director for McCary, Best Actor for Crosby and Best Original Song for "Swinging on a Star".
May 13 – Dale Evans appears in her first film with future husband, Roy Rogers – Cowboy and the Senorita.
July 20 – Since You Went Away is released.
August 16–September 11 – Nazi propaganda documentary Theresienstadt is filmed in the Theresienstadt Ghetto. Following completion of filming, co-director Kurt Gerron and many of those featured are transported to Auschwitz concentration camp and murdered; although completed in 1945, the film is never released.
September 6 – Double Indemnity is released.
September – Around 640 motion picture actors, writers and directors are included on the Gottbegnadeten list in Nazi Germany, protecting them from military conscription.
November 22 – MGM's Meet Me in St. Louis, starring Judy Garland and Margaret O'Brien premieres. Hugely popular with both audiences and critics, the film is nominated for four Academy Awards.

Awards

Top Ten Money Making Stars

1944 film releases

January–March
January 1944
7 January
Standing Room Only
11 January
Career Girl
14 January
Ali Baba and the Forty Thieves
 28 January
Lifeboat
Phantom Lady
February 1944
3 February
None Shall Escape
The Fighting Sullivans
5 February
Captain America
10 February
Lady in the Dark
11 February
The Bridge of San Luis Rey
22 February
Snow White and the Seven Dwarfs (re-issue)
March 1944
2 March
The Curse of the Cat People
10 March
A Guy Named Joe
17 March
Knickerbocker Holiday
22 March
Cover Girl
23 March
The Heavenly Body

April–June
April 1944
9 April
Rosie the Riveter (film)
17 April
The Lady and the Monster
25 April
Pin Up Girl
And the Angels Sing
26 April
The Hitler Gang
May 1944
5 May
Follow the Boys
8 May
Time Flies – (GB)
11 May
The White Cliffs of Dover
13 May
Cowboy and the Senorita
27 May
The Tiger Woman
June 1944
1 June
Address Unknown
8 June
Days of Glory
27 June
Bathing Beauty

July–September
July 1944
2 July
The Hairy Ape
6 July
Double Indemnity
7 July
The Mummy's Ghost
8 July
Johnny Doesn't Live Here Any More
12 July
The Invisible Man's Revenge
14 July
Summer Storm
20 July
Since You Went Away
22 July
The Adventures of Mark Twain
24 July
The Seventh Cross
August 1944
12 August
Mr. Skeffington
16 August
Going My Way
17 August
Cry of the Werewolf
The Soul of a Monster
23 August
Marriage Is a Private Affair
30 August
Till We Meet Again
September 1944
2 September
Our Hearts Were Young and Gay
9 September
Crime by Night
12 September
Strangers in the Night
20 September
Frenchman's Creek
23 September
Arsenic and Old Lace

October–December
October 1944
11 October
To Have and Have Not
17 October
Fiddlers Three – (GB)
None but the Lonely Heart
November 1944
1 November
Something for the Boys
3 November
The Woman in the Window
10 November
Enemy of Women
11 November
Bluebeard
15 November
Thirty Seconds Over Tokyo
28 November
Meet Me in St. Louis
December 1944
1 December
House of Frankenstein
5 December
Blonde Fever
6 December
Nothing but Trouble
15 December
Hollywood Canteen
18 December
Dangerous Passage
22 December
Winged Victory
The Mummy's Curse
23 December
Lake Placid Serenade
24 December
I'll Be Seeing You
29 December
Tomorrow, the World!

Notable films released in 1944
United States unless stated

A
The Adventures of Mark Twain, starring Fredric March
Ali Baba and the Forty Thieves, starring Maria Montez and Jon Hall
And Now Tomorrow, starring Alan Ladd and Loretta Young
And the Angels Sing, starring Fred MacMurray and Dorothy Lamour
Army (陸軍, Rikugun), directed by Keisuke Kinoshita, starring Chishū Ryū and Kinuyo Tanaka – (Japan)
Arsenic and Old Lace, directed by Frank Capra, starring Cary Grant, Priscilla Lane, Raymond Massey, Peter Lorre; filmed in 1941 but not released until 1944

B
Bathing Beauty, starring Esther Williams and Red Skelton
Between Two Worlds, starring John Garfield, Eleanor Parker and Sydney Greenstreet
The Black Pirate (El corsario negro), starring Pedro Armendariz – (Mexico)
The Bridge of San Luis Rey, starring Lynn Bari
Buffalo Bill, starring Joel McCrea and Maureen O'Hara
A Bullet in the Heart (Rossassa Fel Qalb) – (Egypt)

C
Candlelight in Algeria, starring James Mason – (GB)
Can't Help Singing, starring Deanna Durbin
A Canterbury Tale, written and directed by Michael Powell and Emeric Pressburger, starring Eric Portman – (GB)
The Canterville Ghost, starring Charles Laughton, Robert Young and Margaret O'Brien
Casanova Brown, starring Gary Cooper
Champagne Charlie, directed by Alberto Cavalcanti, starring Tommy Trinder and Stanley Holloway – (GB)
The Children Are Watching Us (I bambini ci guardano), directed by Vittorio De Sica – (Italy)
Christmas Holiday, starring Gene Kelly
The Climax, starring Susanna Foster and Boris Karloff
Cobra Woman, starring Maria Montez
The Conspirators, starring Paul Henreid and Hedy Lamarr
Cover Girl, starring Rita Hayworth and Gene Kelly
Cowboy and the Senorita, starring Roy Rogers and Dale Evans
Crime by Night, starring Jane Wyman
Cry of the Werewolf, starring Nina Foch
The Curse of the Cat People, starring Simone Simon

D
Days of Glory, starring Gregory Peck
Don't Take It to Heart, directed by Jeffrey Dell, starring Richard Greene – (GB)
Double Indemnity, directed by Billy Wilder, starring Fred MacMurray, Barbara Stanwyck and Edward G. Robinson
Dragon Seed, starring Katharine Hepburn
Dream of the Red Chamber (Hong lou meng) – (China)

E
Enemy of Women, starring Paul Andor
Experiment Perilous, starring Hedy Lamarr and George Brent

F
Fanny by Gaslight, directed by Anthony Asquith, starring Phyllis Calvert, James Mason, Stewart Granger – (GB)
Fiddlers Three, starring Tommy Trinder (GB)
The Fighting Seabees, starring John Wayne and Susan Hayward
The Fighting Sullivans, directed by Lloyd Bacon, starring Anne Baxter and Thomas Mitchell
For Those in Peril, directed by Charles Crichton – (GB)
Frenchman's Creek, starring Joan Fontaine and Basil Rathbone
Die Feuerzangenbowle (The Punch Bowl) – (Germany)

G
Gaslight, starring Ingrid Bergman, Charles Boyer and Joseph Cotten
Going My Way, directed by Leo McCarey, starring Bing Crosby and Barry Fitzgerald – winner of 7 Oscars
The Great Moment, starring Joel McCrea and Betty Field
Greenwich Village, starring Carmen Miranda and Don Ameche
The Great Sacrifice (Opfergang) – (Germany)

H
Hail the Conquering Hero, written and directed by Preston Sturges, starring Eddie Bracken and Ella Raines
The Halfway House, directed by Basil Dearden, starring Mervyn Johns and Glynis Johns
The Heavenly Body, starring William Powell and Hedy Lamarr
To Have And Have Not, directed by Howard Hawks, starring Humphrey Bogart and Lauren Bacall
Henry V, directed by and starring Laurence Olivier – (GB)
The Hitler Gang, starring Robert Watson
Hollywood Canteen, starring Joan Leslie
Home in Indiana, starring Walter Brennan
The Hour Before the Dawn, starring Veronica Lake
House of Frankenstein, starring Boris Karloff and Lon Chaney Jr.

I
I'll Be Seeing You, starring Ginger Rogers and Shirley Temple
In Our Time, starring Ida Lupino and Paul Henreid
In Society, starring Bud Abbott and Lou Costello
It Happened Tomorrow, starring Dick Powell
Ivan the Terrible (Ivan Grozniy), by director Sergei Eisenstein, starring Nikolai Cherkasov – (U.S.S.R.)

J
Janie, directed by Michael Curtiz, starring Joyce Reynolds
Jwar Bhata – (India)

K
The Keys of the Kingdom, starring Gregory Peck, Cedric Hardwicke, Vincent Price and Roddy McDowall
Knickerbocker Holiday, starring Nelson Eddy
Kismet, starring Ronald Colman and Marlene Dietrich

L
Lady in the Dark, starring Ginger Rogers and Ray Milland
Lady, Let's Dance, ice skating musical starring Belita and comedy ice team Frick and Frack
Lake Placid Serenade, starring Vera Ralston
Laura, directed by Otto Preminger, starring Gene Tierney, Dana Andrews, Clifton Webb and Vincent Price
Lifeboat, directed by Alfred Hitchcock, starring Tallulah Bankhead, John Hodiak, William Bendix, Walter Slezak, Henry Hull and Hume Cronyn
The Lodger, starring Merle Oberon and George Sanders
Lost in a Harem, starring Bud Abbott and Lou Costello

M
Man from Frisco directed by Robert Florey, starring Michael O'Shea and Anne Shirley
Marie-Louise directed by Leopold Lindtberg and an uncredited Franz Schnyder
The Mask of Dimitrios, starring Peter Lorre, Sydney Greenstreet and Zachary Scott
Meet Me in St. Louis, directed by Vincente Minnelli, starring Judy Garland
Meet the People, starring Lucille Ball
Melody of Murder (Mordets Melodi) – (Denmark)
Memphis Belle: A Story of a Flying Fortress, a documentary by William Wyler
Ministry of Fear, starring Ray Milland
The Miracle of Morgan's Creek, directed by Preston Sturges, starring Eddie Bracken and Betty Hutton
Mr. Skeffington, starring Bette Davis and Claude Rains
Mrs. Parkington, starring Greer Garson
The Mummy's Curse, starring Lon Chaney Jr.
The Mummy's Ghost, starring Lon Chaney Jr.
Murder, My Sweet (aka Farewell My Lovely), directed by Edward Dmytryk, starring Dick Powell and Claire Trevor
Music for Millions, starring Margaret O'Brien

N
The Nail (El clavo) – (Spain)
National Velvet, starring Elizabeth Taylor and Mickey Rooney
None but the Lonely Heart, starring Cary Grant and Ethel Barrymore
None Shall Escape, starring Alexander Knox

O
On Approval, starring Clive Brook and Googie Withers – (GB)
Once Upon a Time, starring Cary Grant, Ted Donaldson, Janet Blair
Our Hearts Were Young and Gay, starring Gail Russell and Diana Lynn

P
Pardon My Rhythm, starring Gloria Jean
Passage to Marseille, starring Humphrey Bogart, Claude Rains, Peter Lorre and Sydney Greenstreet
The Pearl of Death, a Sherlock Holmes mystery directed by Roy William Neill, starring Basil Rathbone as Holmes, and Nigel Bruce as Watson; co-starring Rondo Hatton and Evelyn Ankers
Phantom Lady, starring Franchot Tone and Ella Raines
Pin Up Girl, starring Betty Grable
Port of Freedom (Große Freiheit Nr. 7) – (Germany)
Possession (Besættelse) – (Denmark)
The Princess and the Pirate, starring Bob Hope and Virginia Mayo
The Purple Heart, starring Dana Andrews, Richard Conte and Farley Granger

R
Rainbow (Raduga) – (U.S.S.R.)
Rationing, starring Wallace Beery and Marjorie Main
The Rats of Tobruk (aka The Fighting Rats of Tobruk), starring Peter Finch and Chips Rafferty – (Australia)
The Respectable Ladies of Pardubice (Počestné paní pardubické), directed by Martin Frič – (Czechoslovakia)

S
The Scarlet Claw, a Sherlock Holmes mystery directed by Roy William Neill, starring Basil Rathbone as Holmes, and Nigel Bruce as Watson
The Seventh Cross, directed by Fred Zinnemann, starring Spencer Tracy
Sherlock Holmes and The Spider Woman, a Sherlock Holmes mystery directed by Roy William Neill, starring Basil Rathbone as Holmes and Nigel Bruce as Watson; co-starring Gale Sondergaard
Since You Went Away, starring Claudette Colbert, Jennifer Jones and Shirley Temple
Something for the Boys starring Carmen Miranda, Michael O'Shea and Vivian Blaine
Song of Russia, starring Robert Taylor
The Soul of a Monster, starring George Macready
Storm Over Lisbon, starring Vera Ralston
The Story of Dr. Wassell, starring Gary Cooper
Sunday Dinner for a Soldier, starring Anne Baxter and John Hodiak
The Suspect, starring Charles Laughton

T
Tall in the Saddle, starring John Wayne
Thirty Seconds over Tokyo, starring Spencer Tracy and Van Johnson
This Happy Breed, directed by David Lean, starring John Mills and Celia Johnson – (GB)
The Three Caballeros, a Walt Disney animated film starring Donald Duck and Dora Luz (released in South America in 1944, but was released in 1945 in the U.S.)
Time Flies, starring Tommy Handley (GB)
Torment (Hets), directed by Alf Sjoberg – (Sweden)
The Tower of the Seven Hunchbacks (La Torre de los Siete Jorobados) – (Spain)
Tunisian Victory, directed by Frank Capra, Hugh Stewart and John Huston – (US/GB)
Two Thousand Women, starring Flora Robson and Phyllis Calvert – (GB)

U
The Uninvited, starring Ray Milland
Up in Arms, starring Danny Kaye and Dinah Shore

W
The Way Ahead (Immortal Battalion), directed by Carol Reed, starring David Niven and Stanley Holloway – (GB)
Weird Woman, starring Lon Chaney, Jr. and Anne Gwynne
When Strangers Marry, starring Dean Jagger, Kim Hunter, Robert Mitchum
The White Cliffs of Dover, starring Irene Dunne
Wilson, a biopic of President Woodrow Wilson, starring Alexander Knox and Charles Coburn
Wing and a Prayer, directed by Henry Hathaway, starring Dana Andrews and Don Ameche
The Woman in the Window, directed by Fritz Lang, starring Edward G. Robinson and Joan Bennett

Y
The Yellow Rose of Texas, starring Roy Rogers and Dale Evans

Serials
Black Arrow
Captain America, starring Dick Purcell
The Desert Hawk, starring Gilbert Roland and Charles Middleton
The Great Alaskan Mystery
Haunted Harbor, starring Kane Richmond
Mystery of the River Boat
Raiders of Ghost City
The Tiger Woman, starring Linda Stirling
Zorro's Black Whip, starring Linda Stirling

Short film series
Our Gang (1922-1944)
The Three Stooges (1934–1959)

Animated short film series
Mickey Mouse (1928–1953)
Looney Tunes (1930–1969)
Terrytoons (1930–1964)
Merrie Melodies (1931–1969)
Scrappy (1931–1941)
Popeye (1933–1957)
Color Rhapsodies (1934–1949)
Donald Duck (1934–1956)
Goofy (1939–1955)
Andy Panda (1939–1949)
Tom and Jerry (1940–1958)
Bugs Bunny (1940–1962)
Woody Woodpecker (1941–1949)
Swing Symphonies (1941–1945)
The Fox and the Crow (1941–1950)
Red Hot Riding Hood (1943–1949)
Droopy (1943–1958)
Screwball Squirrel (1944–1946)
Sylvester the Cat (1944–1966)

Births
January 5 – Franco Ferrini, Italian screenwriter
January 9 – Harun Farocki, German filmmaker (died 2014)
January 10 – William Sanderson, American actor
January 20 – Margaret Avery, American actress
January 23 – Rutger Hauer, Dutch actor (died 2019)
February 3 – Trisha Noble, Australian singer and actress (died 2021)
February 8 - Roger Lloyd-Pack, English actor (died 2014)
February 13
Stockard Channing, American actress
Michael Ensign, American actor
February 14 – Alan Parker, English director, producer and screenwriter (died 2020)
February 22 – Jonathan Demme, American director, producer and screenwriter (died 2017)
February 29 – Dennis Farina, American actor (died 2013)
March 5 – Peter Weibel, Ukrainian-born Austrian experimental filmmaker
March 6 - Harold Hopkins (actor), Australian actor (died 2011)
March 10 – Richard Gant, American actor
March 14 – Steve Daskewisz, American actor and stunt double (died 2018)
March 24 – R. Lee Ermey, American film, television and voice actor (died 2018)
March 26 – Diana Ross, American singer and actress
April 4 – Craig T. Nelson, American actor
April 6 – Anita Pallenberg, Italian-born actress and model (died 2017)
April 13 – Charles Burnett, American director
April 30 – Jill Clayburgh, American actress (died 2010)
May 4 – Russi Taylor, American voice actress (died 2019)
May 5
Roger Rees, Welsh actor and director (died 2015)
John Rhys-Davies, English actor
May 10 – Jim Abrahams, American director, producer and screenwriter
May 14 – George Lucas, American director, producer and screenwriter
May 16 – Danny Trejo, American actor and voice actor
May 19
Peter Mayhew, English actor (died 2019)
Frank Pellegrino (actor), American actor (died 2017)
May 25 – Frank Oz, American actor, filmmaker and puppeteer
May 26
Olga Bisera, Yugoslav-born Italian actress and producer
Andre Stojka, American voice actor and singer
May 28 – Sondra Locke, American actress (died 2018)
May 29 - Helmut Berger, Austrian actor
June 11 – Roscoe Orman, American actor
June 20 - Oliver Cotton, English actor, comedian and playwright
June 21 - Tony Scott, British director and producer (died 2012)
June 23 – Ingrīda Andriņa, Latvian actress (died 2015)
June 24 - Julian Holloway, British actor
June 29 – Gary Busey, American actor
July 1 – Wahid Hamed, Egyptian screenwriter (died 2021)
July 2 – Viiu Härm, Estonian actress 
July 8 – Jeffrey Tambor, American actor
July 17 – Catherine Schell, Hungarian-born British actress
July 22 - Peter Jason, American character actor
July 28 – Frances Lee McCain, American actress
July 30
Frances de la Tour, English actress
Yoon Jeong-hee, South Korean actress
July 31 – Geraldine Chaplin, American actress
August 2 – Joanna Cassidy, American actress
August 4 - Richard Belzer, American actor and stand-up comedian (died 2023)
August 7 – John Glover, American actor
August 9 – Sam Elliott, American actor
August 11 – Ian McDiarmid, Scottish actor
August 19 – John Roselius, American actor (died 2018)
August 21 – Peter Weir, Australian director, producer and screenwriter
August 30 – Wolf Roth, German actor
September 1 – Beau Starr, American actor
September 6 - Swoosie Kurtz, American actress
September 13 – Jacqueline Bisset, English actress
September 15 – Pik-Sen Lim, Malaysian-British actress
September 16 - Michael Edwards (actor), American actor
September 20 – Jeremy Child, British actor (died 2022)
September 21 - Fannie Flagg, American actress and comedian
September 22
Kathe Green, American actress, model and singer
Frazer Hines, English actor
September 25 – Michael Douglas, American actor and producer
October 1 – Jean-Pierre Castaldi, French actor
October 8 – Dale Dye, American actor, technical advisor, radio personality and writer
October 10 – Lii Tedre, Estonian actress
October 14 - Udo Kier, German actor
October 28 – Dennis Franz, American actor
November 4 – Linda Gary, American actress, voice actress (died 1995)
November 17
Danny DeVito, American actor, comedian, producer and director
Gary Goldman, American animator, producer and director
Lorne Michaels, Canadian-American producer
November 21 – Harold Ramis, American actor, director and screenwriter (died 2014)
November 22 - Paul Brooke, retired English actor
November 25 – Ben Stein, American actor and comedian
December 5 – Jeroen Krabbe, Dutch actor and director
December 12 – Kenneth Cranham, Scottish actor
December 15 – Morgan Paull, American actor (died 2012)
December 17 – Bernard Hill, English actor

Deaths
 January 3 – Aage Hertel, Danish actor (born 1873) 
 March 14 – Merta Sterling, American actress (born 1883)
 April 10 – Pat West, American actor (born 1888)
 July 14 – Emil Fjellström, Swedish actor (born 1884)
 July 18 – Alan Dinehart, American actor (born 1889)
 July 20 – Mildred Harris, American actress (born 1901)
 September 24 – Hugo Thimig, Austrian actor (born 1854)
 October 28 – Kurt Gerron, German film director (born 1897)
 December 9 – Laird Cregar, American actor (born 1913)
 December 13 – Lupe Vélez, Mexican actress (born 1908)
 December 15 – Glenn Miller, American bandleader, actor (born 1904)

Film Debuts 
Lauren Bacall – To Have and Have Not
Red Buttons – Winged Victory
Stan Freberg – Swooner Crooner
Gloria Grahame – Blonde Fever
Judy Holiday – Greenwich Village
Shashi Kapoor – Meena
Angela Lansbury – Gaslight
Janis Paige – Bathing Beauty
Gregory Peck – Days of Glory
Jane Powell – Song of the Open Road
Zachary Scott – The Mask of Dimitrios
Jean Simmons – Give Us the Moon

References 

 
Film by year